ZonePerfect is a manufacturer of health food products located in Columbus, Ohio. They are known for their nutrition bars and shakes, created to comply with the Zone diet.  The brand is a part of the Ross Productions Division of Abbott Laboratories, and is commonly available in grocery stores in the United States.  Their nutrition bars are available in 15 different flavors, each containing at least 12 grams of protein, while their shakes are available in either vanilla or chocolate, and contain 19 grams of protein. 

All ZonePerfect meals are based on the ratio 40:30:30—in other words, the food they market is 40% carbohydrates, 30% protein, and 30% fat. ZonePerfect frequently sponsors competitive events, such as the San Francisco Marathon. The package says they are "All-Natural Nutrition Bars".

References

External links
 Zone Perfect official website
 Ross Productions Division website

Companies based in the Columbus, Ohio metropolitan area
Brand name diet products
Energy food products